"Walking in L.A." is a song by American new wave band Missing Persons. It was written by Terry Bozzio, with production by Ken Scott at Chateau Recorders, in Los Angeles, California. The song appeared on their debut studio album Spring Session M in 1982 and has been described as the pivotal song on the album.  It was released as a single in February 1983. A live version of the song (recorded in 1981) was released as a CD bonus track on Missing Persons’ 1984 album, Rhyme & Reason.

It was a minor hit In the United States, spending 6 weeks on the Billboard Hot 100 chart and peaking at #70 in March 1983.  It is still recalled occasionally today for its comical portrayal of Hollywood culture and its wry observations on getting around in Los Angeles (“Nobody walks in L.A.!”).  Songwriter Terry Bozzio has said that he was inspired to write the song by comedians making jokes about driving everywhere in the city.

Release history

Charts

Cover versions and media appearances
American rock band Hagfish covered the song on the 1997 punk rock compilation album, Before You Were Punk.
American actress and singer Traci Lords covered the song as a promotional single in 2003.
The song is featured in the 2011 film ‘’Take Me Home Tonight.’’
The song is played in Season 1, episode 4, of the MTV reality TV series, The Hills, titled "Lauren And Jason, Take Two" (2006).

References

External links

 

1983 singles
1982 songs
Missing Persons (band) songs
Song recordings produced by Ken Scott
Capitol Records singles